Cerace vietnamna is a species of moth of the family Tortricidae. It is found in northern Vietnam.

The wingspan is about 20 mm. The forewings are yellow with a dark crimson streak. The hindwings are bright yellowish orange with five small blackish dots.

References

Moths described in 1993
Ceracini
Moths of Asia